Addoraca is a white Italian wine grape variety that is grown in the Calabria region of southern Italy where it is blended with Coda di Volpe bianca, Malvasia bianca di Candia and Muscat blanc à Petits Grains in the passito dessert wine Moscato di Saracena.

History

Ampelographers believe that Addoraca likely originated in the Calabria region where the name Addoraca means "perfumed" in the local Calabrian dialect. The grape has a long history of being a minor blending component in the Moscato di Saracena dessert wine that is a specialty of the village of Saracena.

Wine regions

Today Addoraca is almost exclusively found in the province of Cosenza in Calabria where it is most notably used in the production of the straw wine Moscato di Saracena where it is blended with Muscat blanc à Petits Grains (known locally as Moscatello di Saracena), Coda di Volpe bianca (known locally as Guarnaccia bianca) and Malvasia bianca di Candia.

Synonyms
Over the years, Addoraca has also been known under the synonym Odoacra, though this synonym is not officially recognized by the Vitis International Variety Catalogue (VIVC).

References

White wine grape varieties
Wine grapes of Italy